Boulnois is a French surname which may refer to:

 Alfred Boulnois, French cyclist who competed in the 1900 Summer Olympics
 Edmund Boulnois (1838–1911), British businessman and politician
 Joseph Boulnois (1884–1918), French composer and organist
 Michel Boulnois (1907–2008), French composer and organist
 Lucette Boulnois (1931–2009), French historian